The Wieprz is a river in central-eastern Poland, a tributary of the Vistula. It is the country's ninth longest river, with a total length of 349 km and a catchment area of 10,497 km2, all within Poland. Its course near the town of Łęczna includes the protected area known as Wieprz Landscape Park.

The river has its sources in Lake Wieprz, in Wieprzów Tarnawacki near Tomaszow Lubelski, and flows into the Vistula near Dęblin. The Wieprz is connected to another river, the Krzna, through the 140-kilometer Wieprz-Krzna Canal, built in 1954-1961. Because the Wieprz with its wide valley has not been regulated, its nature is very diverse. The meandering river with its oxbow lakes is inhabited by numerous birds, European otters and Eurasian beavers.

During the Polish-Soviet War, units of the Polish 4th Army concentrated along the Wieprz, getting ready for the Battle of Warsaw. In September 1939, during the Invasion of Poland, the Battle of Tomaszow Lubelski took place by the Wieprz.

Towns on the Wieprz
Krasnobród
Zwierzyniec
Szczebrzeszyn
Krasnystaw
Łęczna
Lubartów
Dęblin

See also
List of rivers in Poland

References

Rivers of Poland
Rivers of Masovian Voivodeship
Rivers of Lublin Voivodeship